Daniel Haber may refer to:
 Daniel A. Haber, professor of oncology
 Daniel Haber (soccer), Canadian soccer player